

Incumbents
Monarch: Hans

Events
 Alvsson's rebellion:
 May – A one-year ceasefire was signed between the Norwegian rebels and King Hans, but was broken by the king in December. 
 24 December –  Alvsson's rebellion was crushed at Olsborg Castle in Båhuslen.

Arts and literature

Births

Deaths

References